Səfikürd or Safikyurd or Safykyurd may refer to:
Səfikürd, Goranboy, Azerbaijan
Səfikürd, Goygol, Azerbaijan